Private William L. S. Tabor (June 2, 1843 – December 15, 1921) was an American soldier who fought in the American Civil War. Tabor received his country's highest award for bravery during combat, the Medal of Honor, for his action in the Siege of Port Hudson in Port Hudson, Louisiana in July 1863. He was honored with the award on 10 March 1896.

Biography
Tabor was born in Metheun, Massachusetts, on June 2, 1843. He enlisted into the 15th New Hampshire Infantry's K Company. He died on December 15, 1921 and he is buried in East Derry, New Hampshire.

Medal of Honor citation

See also

List of American Civil War Medal of Honor recipients: T–Z

References

1843 births
1921 deaths
People of Massachusetts in the American Civil War
Union Army soldiers
United States Army Medal of Honor recipients
American Civil War recipients of the Medal of Honor
People of New Hampshire in the American Civil War